Anhui Television (AHTV), is a television network in the Hefei and Anhui province. It was founded and started to broadcast in September 1960. AHTV currently broadcasts in Mandarin.

List of Anhui Television programs

Current programming

Former programming
Kunlun Fight

External links
Official Site 

 
Television networks in China
Television channels and stations established in 1960